A corps in the New Zealand Army is an administrative group that comprises members of similar work functions.

Corps

Current 
The following is a list of the Corps of the New Zealand Army, ordered according to the traditional seniority of all the Corps.
 New Zealand Corps of Officer Cadets
 Royal Regiment of New Zealand Artillery
 Royal New Zealand Armoured Corps
 The Corps of Royal New Zealand Engineers
 Royal New Zealand Corps of Signals
 Royal New Zealand Infantry Regiment
 The New Zealand Special Air Service
 New Zealand Intelligence Corps
 Royal New Zealand Army Logistic Regiment
 Royal New Zealand Army Medical Corps
 Royal New Zealand Dental Corps
 Royal New Zealand Chaplains Department
 New Zealand Army Legal Service
 The Corps of Royal New Zealand Military Police
 Royal New Zealand Army Education Corps
 New Zealand Army Physical Training Corps
 Royal New Zealand Nursing Corps

Disbanded 

New Zealand Staff Corps
New Zealand Permanent Staff
Submarine Mining Volunteers and Torpedo Corps
New Zealand Railway Corps
New Zealand Post and Telegraph Corps
New Zealand Cyclist Corps
New Zealand Machine Gun Corps
New Zealand Army Air Corps
New Zealand Veterinary Corps
 Royal New Zealand Army Service Corps
 Royal New Zealand Corps of Transport
 New Zealand Army Ordnance Corps
 Royal New Zealand Army Ordnance Corps
 Royal New Zealand Electrical and Mechanical Engineers
New Zealand Army Pay Corps
Royal New Zealand Provost Corps
Royal Woman's, New Zealand Army Corps

The New Zealand Medical Corps gained a Royal Warrant in 1947 and therefore became the Royal New Zealand Army Medical Corps.

References 

New Zealand Army
Administrative corps of New Zealand